Crosby Municipal Airport  is a public use airport in Amite County, Mississippi, United States. It is owned by the Town of Crosby and located one nautical mile (2 km) northeast of its central business district. This airport is included in the National Plan of Integrated Airport Systems for 2011–2015, which categorized it as a general aviation facility.

Facilities and aircraft 
Crosby Municipal Airport covers an area of 40 acres (16 ha) at an elevation of 336 feet (102 m) above mean sea level. It has one runway designated 17/35 with an asphalt surface measuring 3,127 by 60 feet (953 x 18 m).

For the 12-month period ending March 27, 2012, the airport had 1,200 general aviation aircraft operations, an average of 100 per month.

See also 
 List of airports in Mississippi

References

External links 
 Crosby Municipal Airport at Town of Crosby website
 Aerial image as of March 1996 from USGS The National Map
 

Airports in Mississippi
Buildings and structures in Amite County, Mississippi
Transportation in Amite County, Mississippi